Danuta Samolewicz-Owczarek (19 December 1929 – 2 February 2006), née Samolewicz, was a Polish chess player who three-time won bronze medals in the Polish Women's Chess Championships (1962, 1965, 1966).

Biography
In the 1960s, Danuta Samolewicz-Owczarek was one of the leading chess players in Poland. In 1954, she made her debut in the Polish Women's Chess Championship final in Gdańsk. From 1954 to 1967 she appeared in the final tournaments ten times and winning three bronze medals: in 1962 (Grudziądz), in 1965 (Łódź) and in 1966 (Koszalin). In 1967, she ranked 4th in the International Women's Chess tournament in Piotrków Trybunalski.

Danuta Samolewicz-Owczarek played for Poland in the Women's Chess Olympiad:
 In 1966, at first reserve board in the 3rd Chess Olympiad (women) in Oberhausen (+4, =0, -4).

References

External links
Danuta Samolewicz-Owczarek chess games at 365Chess.com

1929 births
2006 deaths
Polish female chess players
Chess Olympiad competitors
20th-century chess players